The Snowy Mountains skink or guthega skink, alpine egernia (Liopholis guthega) is a species of skink, a lizard in the family Scincidae. The species is endemic to southeastern  Australia.

References

Skinks of Australia
Liopholis
Reptiles described in 2002